Olu Atogbuwa was the 14th Olu of Warri who ruled over the Kingdom of Warri. He succeeded his father, Olu Akengboye as the 14th Olu of Warri. He took the title, Ogiame Atogbuwa. His Portuguese name was Manuel Octobia. When he went to be with his fathers, he was succeeded by Olu Erejuwa I around 1760.

References

Nigerian traditional rulers
People from Warri
Year of birth unknown
Year of death unknown